The Grand Rapids Public Library located in downtown Grand Rapids, Michigan and also includes seven branch libraries throughout the city.  The library system has 170 full and part-time employees and has a service area of roughly 197,000 people.

History 
The Grand Rapids Public Library was founded in 1871 and was located within the Grand Rapids City Hall.  In 1904, the library moved to the Ryerson building which served as a permanent home for the library.  The building was a gift from arts and education benefactor, and native son, Martin A. Ryerson.  In 1967, the library expanded to more than double in size.  The addition was named the Keeler wing, in honor of a $1.2 million gift from Mike and Mary Ann Keeler.  In 2001, renovation began that forced the library to operate out of a nearby warehouse.  The library was able to move back to 111 Library St. NE in 2003.

Locations

References

External links
Grand Rapids Public Library Official Website
Evergreen Online Card Catalog

Education in Grand Rapids, Michigan
Public libraries in Michigan
Buildings and structures in Grand Rapids, Michigan